K.S.R.M. College of Engineering (Kandula Srinivasa Reddy Memorial College of Engineering, autonomous) is an engineering institute in Andhra Pradesh, India. It is located within the Kadapa city of Andhra Pradesh and affiliated to Jawaharlal Nehru Technological University Anantapuramu.

Programs offered
B.Tech:
 Civil Engineering
 Mechanical Engineering
 Electrical and Electronics Engineering
 Electronics &Communication & Engineering
 Computer Science Engineering
M.Tech:
 Civil Engineering (Geotechnical Engineering)
 Electrical & Electronics Engineering (Power Systems)
 ECE (Digital Communications)
 Mechanical.Engineering (CAD/CAM)

References

External links
 Official college site
 M.C.A Golden Batch

Engineering colleges in Andhra Pradesh
Universities and colleges in Kadapa district
Kadapa
Educational institutions established in 1979
1979 establishments in Andhra Pradesh